Noel Jenkinson (born 18 March 1957) is  a former Australian rules footballer who played with Richmond and South Melbourne in the Victorian Football League (VFL).

Notes

External links 

Living people
1957 births
Australian rules footballers from Victoria (Australia)
Richmond Football Club players
Sydney Swans players